The Syun (Sön; ; , Sön) is a river in Bashkortostan and Tatarstan, Russian Federation, a left-bank tributary of the Belaya (Kama basin).
Major tributaries in Tatarstan are Kalmiya, Sikiya, Terpelya, Bezyada, and Sharan in Bashkortostan. Drainage is regulated. Since 1978 it is protected as a "natural monument of Tatarstan".

References 

Rivers of Bashkortostan
Rivers of Tatarstan